Redan is an inner suburb of Ballarat, Victoria, Australia immediately south of Ballarat Central.

Its boundaries along Winter Street East, Pleasant Street, Sebastopol Street and Hill Street, on the north side; Yarrowee River forms the eastern boundary; Rubicon Street is the southern edge with Sutton Street forming the west side.  Pleasant Street is the main road through the suburb and commercial area.

It was named for the fortifications used during the battle at Sevastopol in Ukraine during the Crimean War.

History

Redan was one of Ballarat's first deep lead gold mining areas on the outskirts Ballarat between the city and the town of Sebastopl.  In the 1870s and 1880s, the Redan lead had a number of larger gold mining companies extracting Sergeants Freehold Quartz Goldmining Company and the Hustler's Line of Reef.

The suburb developed gradually with working class origins, the home of many miners.

A Post Office was first opened here on 1 July 1935.

Layout, housing and growth
Redan is almost entirely laid out in grid plan.  The population is forecast to increase to 3195 in 2021 with 1536 dwellings.

As of September 2009, Redan had the most affordable houses in Australia. 
The population has many people in their teens and early twenties in low cost rental accommodation.  The current median house price in Redan is $190,000.

Sport
Redan has an Australian rules football team playing in the Ballarat Football League.

Redan also has a soccer club Ballarat City FC competing in the National Premier League which is the third tier of Australian soccer behind the national A-League. Since 2014 their home ground is Ballarat Regional Soccer Facility.

References

Mining towns in Victoria (Australia)
Suburbs of Ballarat